Harendra Chaudhary (born 12 March 1976) is an Indian former cricketer. He played seven first-class matches for Delhi between 1998 and 2003.

See also
 List of Delhi cricketers

References

External links
 

1976 births
Living people
Indian cricketers
Delhi cricketers
Cricketers from Delhi